Hydarnes, also known as Idernes, was a Persian nobleman, who was active during the reign of Darius II. He was a descendant (perhaps grandson) of Hydarnes the Younger, who was himself the son of Hydarnes, one of the seven Persian conspirators who overthrew the Pseudo-Smerdis. He was the father of Stateira and Teritoukhmes.

References

Sources
 
 
 
 
 

5th-century BC Iranian people